Dennis Edward Skinner (born 11 February 1932) is a British former politician who served as Member of Parliament (MP) for Bolsover for 49 years, from 1970 to 2019. He is a member of the Labour Party who is known for his left-wing views, republican sentiments, and acerbic wit.

Skinner belonged to the Socialist Campaign Group of Labour MPs. He was a member of Labour's National Executive Committee, with brief breaks, for 30 years, and was the chairman of the Committee in 1988–89. He was one of the longest serving members of the House of Commons and the longest continuously-serving Labour MP. He is a lifelong Eurosceptic.

During his parliamentary career, Skinner was suspended from Parliament on at least ten occasions, usually for unparliamentary language when attacking opponents. He also regularly heckled during the annual Queen's Speech ceremony upon the arrival of Black Rod.

Early life and career
Born in Clay Cross, Derbyshire, Skinner is the third of nine children. His father Edward Skinner was a coal miner who was sacked after the 1926 general strike, and his mother Lucy was a cleaner. In June 1942, at the age of 10, Skinner won a scholarship to attend Tupton Hall Grammar School after passing the eleven-plus a year early. In 1949, he went on to work as a coal miner at Parkhouse colliery, working there until its closure in 1962. He then worked at Glapwell colliery near Bolsover.  In 1956 Skinner entered the Sheffield Star Walk, an amateur walking race, and finished second.

In 1964, at the age of 32, he became the youngest-ever president of the Derbyshire region of the National Union of Mineworkers. After working for 20 years as a miner, he became a member of Derbyshire County Council and a Clay Cross councillor in the 1960s. In 1967, he attended Ruskin College, after completing a course run by the National Union of Mineworkers at the University of Sheffield.

Parliamentary career

In 1956, Skinner joined the Labour Party. He was chosen as Parliamentary Prospective candidate for Bolsover on 5 June 1969. Skinner was elected as MP for the-then safe Labour seat of Bolsover at the 1970 general election. Due to his aggressive rhetoric, Skinner became known as the "Beast of Bolsover". Skinner recalls that he earned the nickname for his behaviour in a tribute debate in the Commons following the death of former Conservative Prime Minister Sir Anthony Eden in 1977: "They were making speeches about the wonder of Anthony Eden, so I got up and talked about miners and people seriously injured and dead in the pits and the £200 given to the widow. There was booing and then all the Tories left and the papers had a go, some serious ones".

During his tenure in the Commons, Skinner would usually sit on the first seat of the front bench below the gangway in the Commons (known as the 'Awkward Squad Bench' because it is where rebel Labour Party MPs have traditionally sat) in a tweed jacket (whilst most other MPs wear suits) and signature red tie. In 2016, he stated that he had never sent an email and did not have a Twitter account.

Skinner was a strong supporter of the National Union of Mineworkers and their leader Arthur Scargill in the 1984–85 miners' strike. Skinner refused to accept a parliamentary salary in excess of miners' wages, and during the miners' strike he donated his wages to the NUM.

Skinner has voted for equalisation of the age of consent, civil partnerships, adoption rights for same-sex couples, to outlaw discrimination on the grounds of sexual orientation, and for same-sex couples to marry, and has a strongly pro-choice stance on abortion. On 20 January 1989, he talked out a move to reduce the number of weeks at which an abortion can be legally performed in Britain by moving the writ for the Richmond by-election. On 7 June 1985, he talked out a bill by UUP backbencher Enoch Powell which would have banned stem cell research by moving the writ for the by-election in Brecon and Radnor. Skinner later described this as his proudest political moment.

In 1979, Skinner played a role in publicly exposing Anthony Blunt as a spy for the Soviet Union. On Thursday 15 November 1979, Prime Minister Margaret Thatcher revealed Blunt's wartime role in the House of Commons of the United Kingdom in reply to questions put to her by Ted Leadbitter, MP for Hartlepool, and Skinner:
Mr. Leadbitter and Mr. Skinner: Asked the Prime Minister if she will make a statement on recent evidence concerning the actions of an individual, whose name has been supplied to her, in relation to the security of the United Kingdom.
The Prime Minister: "The name which the hon. Member for Hartlepool (Mr. Leadbitter) has given me is that of Sir Anthony Blunt."

In 2000, Skinner denounced former ally Ken Livingstone, then serving as a Labour MP. Livingstone had failed to win the party's nomination to be a candidate for Mayor of London after being defeated by Conservative candidate Boris Johnson, and had then decided to run as an independent candidate instead, urging his supporters to help Green Party candidates get elected. Skinner said that Livingstone had betrayed Labour Party activists in his Brent East constituency, whom he described as having fought for him "like tigers" when his majority had been small: "He tells them he's going to be the Labour candidate, then he lies to them. To me that's as low as you can get". He contrasted Livingstone with the official Labour candidate, Frank Dobson, saying that Dobson was "a bloke and a half... not a prima donna ... not someone with an ego as big as a house". Skinner said Livingstone would "hit the headlines, but you'll never be able to trust him because he's broken his pledge and his loyalty to his party. The personality cult of the ego does not work down a coal mine and it does not work in the Labour Party".

Conversely, despite his renowned left-wing views, Skinner for a long time had a positive relationship with Prime Minister Tony Blair, a leading figure on the right-wing of the party, stemming from advice that Skinner gave Blair regarding public speaking. As recently as February 2018, he described the Tony Blair and Gordon Brown ministries as a "golden period" for the NHS. However, Skinner strongly criticised Blair in May 2019, after the former Prime Minister had advised pro-Remain Labour supporters who felt that the party's line on Brexit was too ambiguous to vote for explicitly pro-Remain parties in the 2019 European Parliament election; in the Morning Star, Skinner described Blair as a "destructive force" who was "try(ing) to destroy the Labour Party so people keep talking about his reign" and stating that he "went into Iraq and destroyed himself. He helped David Cameron and Theresa May into power. You're talking about a man who made a mess of it."

In 2003, Skinner was among the quarter of Labour MPs who voted against the Iraq War; he later rebelled against the party line when he voted against government policy to allow terror suspects to be detained without trial for up to 90 days. In 2007, Skinner and 88 other Labour MPs voted against the Labour Government's policy of renewing the Trident Nuclear Missile System.

Skinner supported David Miliband in the 2010 Labour leadership election, which was won by his brother Ed Miliband. In March 2011, he was one of 15 MPs who voted against British participation in NATO's Libya intervention.

In May 2014, Skinner was the principal guest speaker at the Kent Miners Rally at the Aylesham & District Social Club to commemorate 30 years since the Miners Strike 1984/1985. 

Skinner was one of 36 Labour MPs to nominate Jeremy Corbyn as a candidate in the Labour leadership election of 2015. Shortly after Corbyn was elected as leader, Skinner was elected to Labour's National Executive Committee, on which he remained until October 2016. Skinner supported Corbyn, alongside the majority of Labour MPs, in voting against the extension of RAF airstrikes against ISIS in Syria in December 2015. Skinner voted for Britain to leave the European Union in June 2016 and favours outright abolition of the House of Lords.

Following the retirement of Peter Tapsell in 2015, Skinner was one of the four longest-serving MPs, but did not become Father of the House, as two other MPs, who were also first elected in 1970, had been sworn in earlier on the same day and consecutively both held that position: Gerald Kaufman (2015–2017) and Kenneth Clarke (2017–2019). Skinner, the oldest sitting MP since 2017, stated that in any case he would not accept the honorific title. In 2019, with Clarke's impending retirement, the issue of Skinner becoming Father of the House resurfaced but was rendered moot, when Skinner lost his seat at the 2019 general election to Mark Fletcher of the Conservative Party.

Suspensions
Skinner was suspended from Parliament on at least 10 occasions, usually for unparliamentary language when attacking opponents. Notable infractions included:
 In 1981, accusing speaker of the House of Commons George Thomas of attending functions to raise funds for the Conservative Party.
 Twice in 1984, once for calling David Owen a "pompous sod" (and only agreeing to withdraw "pompous"), and the second time for stating Margaret Thatcher would "bribe judges".
 In 1992, referring to the Minister of Agriculture John Gummer as "a little squirt of a Minister" and "a slimy wart on Margaret Thatcher's nose".
 In 1995, accusing the Major government of a "crooked deal" to sell off Britain's coal mines.
 In 2005, when referring to the economic record of the Conservatives in the 1980s, making the remark, "The only thing that was growing then were the lines of coke in front of 'Boy George' and the rest of the Tories", a reference to allegations originally published in the Sunday Mirror of cocaine use by the newly appointed Shadow Chancellor, George Osborne (though, in the Commons, Skinner referred to the News of the World).
 In 2006, accusing Deputy Speaker Alan Haselhurst of leniency towards remarks made by opposition frontbencher and future Prime Minister Theresa May "because she's a Tory".
 In 2016, for referring to Prime Minister David Cameron as "dodgy Dave" in relation to Cameron's tax affairs.

Queen's Speech quips
Known for his republican sentiments, Skinner regularly heckled during the annual Queen's Speech ceremony. He did this upon the arrival of Black Rod (the symbol of royal authority in the House of Lords) to summon MPs to hear the Queen's speech in the Lords' chamber. The best known, according to the New Statesman and other sources, are listed as follows:

Popular culture

Nature of the Beast documentary

A documentary about Skinner sanctioned by him, Nature of the Beast, was completed in 2017 by production company Shut Out The Light. The documentary traces Skinner's rise to political icon status and covers his working-class upbringing, his family influences and his hobbies away from "The Palace of Varieties". Skinner's four surviving brothers and several of his Bolsover constituents were interviewed for the documentary.

Stage play
Derby Theatre commissioned Kevin Fegan to write a play inspired by Skinner, entitled The Palace of Varieties – life and times of Dennis Skinner, to be performed at Derby Theatre in early 2022.

After parliament
In 2020, Skinner endorsed Richard Burgon for Deputy Leader of the Labour Party.

On 6 May 2020, he was named honorary president of the Socialist Campaign Group.

In September 2020, Robb Johnson's song about Skinner, Tony Skinner's Lad, topped the Amazon download chart.

Personal life
In 1960, Skinner married Mary Parker, from whom he separated in 1989. He has three children and four grandchildren. Since 2017, his partner has been former researcher Lois Blasenheim.

In 1999, Skinner was diagnosed with advanced bladder cancer and subsequently had surgery to remove a malignant tumour. In 2003, he underwent a double heart bypass operation. He underwent hip surgery in 2019. He was too ill to campaign in the 2019 general election after he was hospitalised with a dangerous infection following the hip operation. He was not present at the count when he lost his seat.

Skinner's mother was diagnosed with Alzheimer's disease prior to her death in the 1980s. Skinner sang to his late mother when she was diagnosed with the disease and was inspired by her ability to recall old songs. Since 2008, he has visited care homes in Derbyshire to sing to elderly patients with dementia.

Skinner is a supporter of Derby County Football Club and Derbyshire County Cricket Club.

References

External links

 
 Biography at Stuart Thomson
 Contact details at This Is Derbyshire
  on the 
 This much I know, Skinner runs down some matters of importance to him, hosted by The Guardian
 
 

Articles
 Giving George Osborne a line of wit in December 2005
 Junction 29A in December 2004
 Heart bypass in March 2003

1932 births
Living people
Alumni of Ruskin College
Anti-monarchists
British Eurosceptics
Chairs of the Labour Party (UK)
Councillors in Derbyshire
European democratic socialists
English miners
English republicans
English trade unionists
Labour Party (UK) councillors
Members of the Parliament of the United Kingdom for constituencies in Derbyshire
National Union of Mineworkers-sponsored MPs
People educated at Tupton Hall School
People from Clay Cross
People from South Normanton
UK MPs 1970–1974
UK MPs 1974
UK MPs 1974–1979
UK MPs 1979–1983
UK MPs 1983–1987
UK MPs 1987–1992
UK MPs 1992–1997
UK MPs 1997–2001
UK MPs 2001–2005
UK MPs 2005–2010
UK MPs 2010–2015
UK MPs 2015–2017
UK MPs 2017–2019